Don't Fool Me (lit. Hero of Central) is a 1991 Hong Kong action comedy film directed by Herman Yau starring Andy Lau, Tony Leung, Teresa Mo and Fennie Yuen.

Plot
Hero Wah (Andy Lau) and Cheung Ho-kit (Tony Leung) star are two old friends who meet up in later life. Hero is a triad gang member and Kit is an insurance salesman, Hero is looking for a career change and Kit has become disillusioned with life after discovering he has a "bubble" in his brain that could burst at any time killing him. The two decide to switch lives for a bit with the Triad going respectable and the Insurance Salesman taking on the world of the Triads. As well as a new life, both of the two friends find new love.

Cast
Andy Lau as Hero Wah
Tony Leung Chiu-wai as Cheung Ho-kit
Teresa Mo as Miss Mui
Fennie Yuen as Fanny
Charine Chan as Margaret
Michael Chan as Fanny's father
Shing Fui-On as Mad Po
Tien Feng as Yip Chi-mei
Anthony Wong as Su, Turtle's Brother
Gabriel Wong as Turtle
Stuart Ong as Mister Yung
Yau Kin-kwok as Kung Fu bodyguard
Jeffrey Lam as Big Brother in bar
Chow Mei-yan as TV reporter
Sin Kwok-wah
Hoi Sang Lee as Big Mouth
Leung Sap-yat
Shui Jing-mai
Wong Chi-keung as Chiuchow boss
Au Siu-hei
Kam Yat-lung
Nip Pang-fung
Bruce Law as Brother Nut
James Ha as Mad Po's thug
Tsang Kan-wing as Senior police officer
Sham Chin-po as robber
Hau Woon-ling as Temple medium
Garry Chan as angry driver
Chan King as casino clerk
Anthony Cho as rascal
Steve Mak as rascal
Choi Kwok-keung as robber
Ho Wing-cheung as robber
Fung Man-kwong as robber

Theme song
End of Fate (緣盡)
Composer: Lowell Lo
Lyricist: Calvin Poon
Singer: Andy Lau

Box office
This film grossed HK$13,402,221 at the Hong Kong box office during its theatrical run from 2 to 22 March 1991 in Hong Kong.

See also
Andy Lau filmography

External links

1991 films
1991 martial arts films
1991 action comedy films
1990s Cantonese-language films
Hong Kong action comedy films
Hong Kong martial arts comedy films
Hong Kong slapstick comedy films
Films directed by Herman Yau
Films set in Hong Kong
Films shot in Hong Kong
Triad films
1990s Hong Kong films